Lewis Bagot (1 January 1740 – 4 June 1802) was an English cleric who served as the Bishop of Bristol, Norwich, and St Asaph.

Early life

He was the fifth son of Sir Walter Wagstaffe Bagot of Blithfield Hall, Staffordshire and the former Lady Barbara Legg (a daughter of William Legge, 1st Earl of Dartmouth). Among his elder brothers were William, Lord Bagot, the Rev. Walter Bagot of Pype Hayes Hall (who married Anne Swinnerton and, later, Mary Ward), and Richard Bagot (who married a daughter of Viscount Andover).

Career
He was educated at Westminster School and at Christ Church, Oxford.

He was ordained in 1765 and was Canon of Christ Church 1771–1777 and Dean of Christ Church 1777–1783. He was appointed Bishop of Bristol in 1782, Bishop of Norwich in 1783 and Bishop of St Asaph 1790.

His portrait appears in the National Portrait Gallery.

See also
William Bagot, 1st Baron Bagot

References

1740 births
1802 deaths
Alumni of Christ Church, Oxford
Bishops of Bristol
Bishops of Norwich
Bishops of St Asaph
People educated at Westminster School, London
People from the Borough of East Staffordshire
18th-century Church of England bishops
Deans of Christ Church, Oxford
Younger sons of baronets
18th-century Welsh Anglican bishops